Lachezar Mladenov (born 19 March 1982) is a Bulgarian retired footballer who played as a defender.

External links 
 

Bulgarian footballers
1982 births
Living people
FC Sportist Svoge players
Association football defenders
People from Svoge
Sportspeople from Sofia Province